Terry J. Caulley (born June 22, 1984) is an American former gridiron football running back. He played college football at University of Connecticut. Despite sitting out the second half of 2003 and the entire 2004 season with a knee injury, he racked up 3,187 rushing yards including 31 touchdowns. In 2003, Caulley had a breakout game against the Buffalo, rushing for 236 yards. Despite having a successful college career, he was not selected in the 2007 NFL Draft. However, he signed with the Washington Redskins as an undrafted rookie free agent on April 30, 2007, but was released by the Redskins on June 1, 2007. Caulley played for the Hamilton Tiger-Cats of the Canadian Football League (CFL) from 2007 to 2009. On November 6, 2009, the Tiger-Cats released Caulley.

College statistics

References

External links
 Just Sports Stats

1984 births
Living people
American football running backs
Canadian football running backs
American players of Canadian football
Hamilton Tiger-Cats players
UConn Huskies football players
Washington Redskins players
People from Calvert County, Maryland
Players of American football from Honolulu
Players of Canadian football from Honolulu
Players of American football from Maryland